Oskar Bie (9 February 1864 – 21 April 1938) was a German art historian and author of Jewish origin.

Life 
Born in Breslau, Bie studied philosophy, art and music history at the universities of Breslau, Leipzig and Berlin. In 1886, he achieved his doctorate and habilitated in 1890 at the Technical University of Berlin in art history.

From 1894 1922, he was the chief editor of the literary magazine Die neue Rundschau and made it one of the leading cultural monthly magazines in Germany. As a critic of opera, music and art, he worked for the papers Berliner Börsen-Courier and Die Weltbühne.

In 1901, Bie was appointed professor. He taught aesthetics at the Musikhochschule Berlin from 1921. No reprints of his books were allowed after 1933.

He died in Berlin.

Selected publications 
Zwischen den Künsten. Beiträge zur modernen Ästhetik (1895)
Die Musen in der antiken Kunst (1887)
Das Klavier und seine Meister (1898)
Der Tanz als Kunstwerk (1905)
Die moderne Musik und Richard Strauss (1906)
Constantin Somoff (1907)
Reise um die Kunst (1910)
Die Oper (1913)
Das Deutsche Lied (1926)

 Notes 

 Further reading 
 Lexikon deutsch-jüdischer Autoren, vol 1, München 1992
 Oscar Bie, in: Richard Drews / Alfred Kantorowicz (ed.), verboten und verbrannt. Deutsche Literatur - 12 Jahre unterdrückt'', Berlin und München: Heinz Ullstein - Helmut Kindler Verlag, 1947, ps. 21f
 Deutscher Wirtschaftsverlag, AG (ed.): Reichshandbuch der Deutschen Gesellschaft, vol 1, Berlin, 1931

External links 

German people of Jewish descent
German art historians
German male journalists
German journalists
1864 births
1938 deaths
Writers from Wrocław
People from the Province of Silesia
German male writers